Chris Keeble (born 17 September 1978) is an English former professional footballer who played in The Football League as a midfielder.

Career
Keeble began his career at Ipswich Town, making his debut against Port Vale in December 1997. In March 2000, Keeble joined Colchester United on a permanent basis. In May 2001, Keeble injured his Achilles tendon in a match against Wycombe Wanderers. Having been troubled by injury for more than a year and put into the reserve team, Keeble was released by Colchester in 2003 after not being offered a new contract. He then dropped out of the football league to join Heybridge Swifts.

He is the son of centre-forward Vic Keeble, who played for Colchester United, Newcastle United and West Ham United in the 1940s and 1950s.

References

External links
Chris Keeble at 11v11.com
Chris Keeble at coludata.co.uk

1978 births
Living people
Sportspeople from Colchester
Association football midfielders
English footballers
Colchester United F.C. players
Heybridge Swifts F.C. players
Ipswich Town F.C. players
English Football League players